Bishop Dmytro Bohdan Hryhorak, O.S.B.M. (born 1 January 1956) is a Ukrainian Greek Catholic hierarch as an Eparchial Bishop of Buchach since 23 July 2011. Previously he served as an Apostolic Administrator of the same Eparchy from 28 July 2007 until 21 July 2011.

Life
Bishop Hryhorak was born to clandestine Greek-Catholics Dmytro and Mariya (née Prypkhan) Hryhorak. He graduated Oil and Gas Institute in Ivano-Frankivsk (1973–1978) with a diploma in mechanical engineering. Then he worked as design engineer, until joined the Order of Saint Basil the Great in 1989; he had a profession on 14 October 1989 and a solemn profession on 2 February 1997. But before his solemn profession he was ordained as priest on 25 October 1992, while studied in the Theological Academy in Ivano-Frankivsk. Then he continued his studies in the Catholic University of Lublin in Poland with magister degree in Ecclesiology.

During 1992–2007 he served in the different Basilian monasteries as priest, superior, missionary and chaplain.

After the resignation oh the first Eparchial Bishop of Ukrainian Catholic Eparchy of Buchach, on 28 July 2007 Fr. Dmytro Hryhorak was appointed by the Pope Benedict XVI as an Apostolic Administrator "ad nutum Sanctae Sedis" and 4 years later, in July 2011, he was elected the second Eparchial Bishop of the Eparchy of Buchach. On 28 September 2011 he was consecrated as bishop by Major Archbishop Sviatoslav Shevchuk and other hierarchs of the Ukrainian Greek Catholic Church.

References

1956 births
Living people
Religious leaders from Ivano-Frankivsk
John Paul II Catholic University of Lublin alumni
Ukrainian Eastern Catholics
Bishops of the Ukrainian Greek Catholic Church
Order of Saint Basil the Great